The Parliament Square Peace Campaign was a peace camp outside the Palace of Westminster in Parliament Square, London, from 2001 to 2013. Activist Brian Haw launched the campaign at the site on 2 June 2001, initially as an around-the-clock protest in response to the United Nations economic sanctions imposed on Iraq. His protest grew broader following the war in Afghanistan and 2003 invasion of Iraq. He was joined by Barbara Tucker in December 2005, and stayed at the site day and night for nearly a decade.

Tucker carried on the campaign following Haw's death in June 2011. The London Evening Standard reported in January 2013 that Tucker had started a hunger strike after protesting in the square for a total of eight years. The permanent protest camp was removed later in 2013.

See also
 Stop the War Coalition
 White House Peace Vigil
 List of peace activists
 Thomas
 Concepcion Picciotto
 Ellen Thomas
 Barbara Grace Tucker

Documentaries
Brian & Co. Parliament Square SW1 by Yumiko Hayakawa
Letters from Parliament Square by Carlos Serrano Azcona

References

External links

 Parliament Square Peace Campaign website
 Background information on the Parliament Square Peace Campaign

Peace camps
2001 establishments in England
2013 disestablishments in England
Protests in London
2001 in London
Peace Campaign